María de las Mercedes Jijón de Vivanco y Chiriboga (b. 25 March 1811, Otavalo — d. 4 June 1878, Quito) was the first First Lady of Ecuador, serving in that capacity twice alongside her husband, Juan José Flores.

Early life
Mercedes Jijón was born in Otavalo, Ecuador, then part of the Real Audiencia of Quito, on 25 March 1811 to the landowner and merchant Antonio Jijón Chiriboga and his wife, Mariana Vivanco Calisto. Mercedes and her ten older siblings were born into a respected and influential, as well as rich, family.

Marriage
After the Ecuadorian War of Independence and the annexation of the Real Audiencia of Quito into Gran Colombia, the Venezuelan general Juan José Flores was designated Prefect of the Ecuador Department. To legitimize his administration to the people of Ecuador, Flores decide to marry Mercedes, then only 13 years old.

Flores and Jijón were married in the Cathedral of Quito on 21 October 1824 in a ceremony presided over by Archbishop of Quito Nicolás de Arteta y Calisto, their godfather via . A number of military and political officials were also in attendance, in addition to Jijón's relatives.

See also

 First ladies and gentlemen of Ecuador

Citations

References

External links
 Origins and descendants of Mercedes Jijón, from the Ecuadorian genealogical database of Mauricio Alvarado-Dávila

1811 births
1878 deaths
First ladies of Ecuador
People from Otavalo (city)